The following is a production discography of American record producer Tyrone "Ty" Fyffe (also known as Sugarless). It includes a list of songs produced, co-produced and remixed by year, title, artist and album.

Production discography

Remixes

References

External links 

Hip hop discographies
Production discographies